Sharon Halford (born 27 November 1953) is a Falkland Islands politician who served as a Member of the Legislative Assembly for the Camp constituency from 2009 until 2013. Halford was also a Member of the Legislative Council from 1993–2001 for Stanley.

In 2011 Halford and her husband represented the islands at the wedding of Prince William and Catherine Middleton. She also attended the Overseas Territories Joint Ministerial Council meeting in London in 2012 with Jan Cheek and in 2013 Halford took part in a campaign to promote the interests of the Falkland Islanders following the sovereignty referendum. This included representing the Falklands at the United Nations Special Committee on Decolonization in New York City and at the annual conference of the British Islands and Mediterranean Region of the Commonwealth Parliamentary Association. Halford stood for re-election in November 2013, but lost her seat to Phyl Rendell.

References

1953 births
Living people
Falkland Islands Councillors 1993–1997
Falkland Islands Councillors 1997–2001
Falkland Islands MLAs 2009–2013
People from Stanley, Falkland Islands
Falkland Islands women in politics
20th-century British women politicians
21st-century British women politicians